Rochefort may refer to:

Places

France 
 Rochefort, Charente-Maritime, in the Charente-Maritime department
 Arsenal de Rochefort, a former naval base and dockyard
 Rochefort, Savoie in the Savoie department
 Rochefort-du-Gard, in the Gard department
 Rochefort-en-Terre, in the Morbihan department
 Rochefort-en-Valdaine, in the Drôme department
 Rochefort-en-Yvelines, in the Yvelines department
 Rochefort-Montagne, in the Puy-de-Dôme department
 Rochefort-Samson, in the Drôme department
 Rochefort-sur-Brévon, in the Côte-d'Or department
 Rochefort-sur-la-Côte, in the Haute-Marne department
 Rochefort-sur-Loire, in the Maine-et-Loire department
 Rochefort-sur-Nenon, in the Jura department

Elsewhere 
 Rochefort, Belgium
 Rochefort, Switzerland
 Aiguille de Rochefort, a mountain in the French-Italian Alps
 Dôme de Rochefort, another mountain in the French-Italian Alps
 Canton of Rochefort

Other uses
 Rochefort (surname)
 Rochefort Abbey, Cistercian abbey in the town of Rochefort, Belgium
 Rochefort Brewery, Trappist beer brewery located on the site of the abbey
 The Young Girls of Rochefort, a 1967 French musical film written and directed by Jacques Demy
 Raid on Rochefort, a 1757 British military expedition
 4172 Rochefort, a main-belt asteroid
 Princes of Rochefort, a junior branch of the noble House of Rohan